Klub Sportowy Konfeks Legnica is a Polish football team based in Legnica and founded in 1971. Currently, Konfeks are playing in the 5th level of Polish football.

The club's best achievement was reaching the third tier of Polish football (now known as the Polish Second League) during the 1991–92 through 1993–94 seasons.

References

External links
 Official Page

Football clubs in Poland
Association football clubs established in 1971
1971 establishments in Poland
Football clubs in Lower Silesian Voivodeship
Legnica